The 1929 Tuskegee Golden Tigers football team was an American football team that represented Tuskegee University as a member of the Southern Intercollegiate Athletic Conference (SIAC) during the 1929 college football season. In their seventh season under head coach Cleveland Abbott, Tuskegee compiled a 9–0 record, won the SIAC championship, shut out seven of 10 opponents, and outscored all opponents by a total of 249 to 45. The team was recognized as the black college national champion. 

Ben Stevenson was the team captain.

Schedule

References

Tuskegee
Tuskegee Golden Tigers football seasons
Black college football national champions
College football undefeated seasons
Tuskegee Golden Tigers football